Iman Chakraborty (born 13 September 1989) is an Indian singer and actress. Chakraborty won the National Film Award for Best Female Playback Singer in the year 2017 for her Bengali song "Tumi Jaake Bhalobasho" from Praktan film. Accordingly, She is one of the few singers who have won a national award for the debut film song in India.

Early life and career
Iman was born in the town Liluah of the Howrah district of the West Bengal state of India. During her growing up days she learnt music from her late mother Trishna Chakraborty and  got inclined towards literary works of Rabindranath Tagore.

Her first break came when she approached Indian record label company Saregama, which decided to produce her first album 'Bosh te dio kachhe' in Bengali language. The album consisted of renditions of a few songs by Tagore.
The album caught the eyes of composer Anupam Roy, who wanted to experiment with a fresh voice, with new vocal and tonal qualities, for his composition. She subsequently sang Roy's Bengali film song composition "Tumi Jaake Bhalobasho" which was her debut film song. The song earned her the National Film Award for Best Female Playback Singer

In December 2018, she released the song "Monn", the title song of the Tollywood album Monn. It was a duet with singer Sarbajit Ghosh, who is also the music director, composer, lyricist and producer of the song.

Musical influences
Chakraborty is heavily inspired by Rabindranath Tagore

Accolades
National Award for the Best Female Playback singer (2017).

Filmography

Films

Web series

References

External links
 
 

Living people
1989 births
People from Howrah
Singers from West Bengal
Women musicians from West Bengal
Indian women playback singers
Bengali playback singers
Indian film actresses
Indian web series actresses
Bengali actresses
Actresses in Bengali cinema
Best Female Playback Singer National Film Award winners
21st-century Bengalis
21st-century Indian singers
21st-century Indian women singers
21st-century Indian actresses